Walter Worthy Gillard (10 July 1874 – 8 October 1931) was an Australian rules footballer who played with Collingwood in the Victorian Football League (VFL).

Notes

External links 

		
Wal Gillard's profile at Collingwood Forever

1874 births
1931 deaths
Australian rules footballers from Victoria (Australia)
Australian Rules footballers: place kick exponents
Collingwood Football Club (VFA) players
Collingwood Football Club players